Yambe Island (Swahili Kisiwa cha Yambe) is protected, uninhabited historic island located directly east of the city of Tanga in Tanga District of Tanga Region in Tanzania. It is the largest island in Tanga region. It is located entirely with the Tanga Coelacanth Marine Park (TCMP). The island is administered by the Tanzania Marine Parks and Reserves.  The island is also home to medieval Swahili ruins that have yet to be excavated.

See also
Historic Swahili Settlements
National Historic Sites in Tanzania
Swahili architecture

References

Swahili people
Swahili city-states
Swahili culture
Uninhabited islands of Tanzania
Tanga, Tanzania
Geography of Tanga Region
National Historic Sites in Tanga Region
National Historic Sites in Tanzania
Islands of Tanga Region
Archaeological sites in Tanzania